Sant Boi, Catalan for Saint Baudilus, may refer to:

Sant Boi Bridge, first steel structure in the high-speed railway joining the city of Madrid and Barcelona
Sant Boi de Llobregat, town in the comarca of Baix Llobregat
Sant Boi (Llobregat–Anoia Line), railway station in the municipality of Sant Boi de Llobregat
Sant Boi de Llobregat Museum, museum in Sant Boi de Llobregat 
Sant Boi de Lluçanès, municipality in the comarca of Osona

See also 
 Boi (disambiguation)